Little Ellen is an American preschool animated television series produced by Ellen Digital Ventures and Warner Bros. Animation; it is the first Warner Bros. Animation produced series created for Warner Bros. Discovery's streaming service HBO Max under the Cartoonito brand on September 13, 2021. The series central character is a seven-year-old Ellen DeGeneres. The second season was released on March 3, 2022. A third season was completed and slated to premiere in June 2022 before encountering delays. 

The series is the first series aimed at a preschool audience from Warner Bros. Animation since Firehouse Tales.

Animation services are provided by Lighthouse Studios.

Plot
The show explores the world through the eyes of Ellen DeGeneres as a child.

Cast
Laurel Emory as Ellen DeGeneres
Johanna Colón as Becky, Ellen's cousin
JeCobi Swain as Freckle, Ellen and Becky's music-loving friend.
June Squibb as Gramsy, Ellen and Becky's optimistic, wise, and enigmatic grandmother.

Episodes

Series overview

Season 1 (2021)

Season 2 (2022)

International broadcast 
In Canada, the series premiered on Treehouse TV and StackTV on October 1, 2021.

The series premiered on Cartoonito in Latin America on December 1, 2021, as part of its launch.

The series premiered on Boomerang in Portugal on June 20, 2022, as part of its Cartoonito block.

The series was going to premiere on Cartoonito in the UK and Ireland on July 4, 2022, but it was pulled before it aired.

Cancellation
On August 3, 2022, the series was canceled leaving the third season and a completed fourth season unreleased. The series was removed from HBO Max's streaming library on August 18, 2022.

References

External links
 

2020s American LGBT-related animated television series
2020s American LGBT-related comedy television series
2020s American animated television series
2020s American children's comedy television series
2020s preschool education television series
2021 American television series debuts
2022 American television series endings
American children's animated comedy television series
American preschool education television series
Animated preschool education television series
Animated television series about children
Animation based on real people
Animation controversies in television
Cartoonito original programming
English-language television shows
HBO Max original programming
Television series by A Very Good Production
Television series by Warner Bros. Animation
Television shows set in New Orleans
Television series set in 1965